Jill Elizabeth Pitkeathley, Baroness Pitkeathley,  (née Bisson; born 4 January 1940) is a British Labour Party member of the House of Lords.

Her first job was working for Manchester City Council as a trainee child care officer in 1961.  She was paid £660 a year.

She worked in the voluntary sector, as chief executive of Carers National Association (now renamed Carers UK) for which she was appointed an OBE in the 1993 Birthday Honours. Mrs Pitkeathley was created a life peer as Baroness Pitkeathley, of Caversham in the Royal County of Berkshire, on 6 October 1997. Since 1998 she has been chair of one of the lottery distributors, the New Opportunities Fund. In 2004, she was appointed chair of the Children and Family Court Advisory and Support Service (CAFCASS). Lady Pitkeathley also chaired the Office for Civil Society Advisory Body until its abolition in March 2011.

Lady Pitkeathley was a founding member of ACEVO, the Association of Chief Executives of Voluntary Organisations. She is a trustee of Cumberland Lodge.

References

1940 births
Living people
Pitkeathley, Jill Pitkeathley, Baroness
Life peeresses created by Elizabeth II
Officers of the Order of the British Empire